The Victoria River, a perennial river of the North-East Murray catchment of the Murray-Darling basin, is located in the East Gippsland and Alpine regions of Victoria, Australia.

Location and features
The Victoria River rises below Bull Plain, near Rundells Yard, and flows generally east and then north, joined by one minor tributary, before reaching its confluence with the Cobungra River in the Alpine National Park, north of the locality of Cobungra. The river descends  over its  course.

The river is traversed by Great Alpine Road near Cobungra. The Victoria River Track, a walking trail, follows much of the course of the river.

See also

References

North-East catchment
Rivers of Gippsland (region)
Rivers of Hume (region)
Tributaries of the Murray River
Victorian Alps